The Association of Universities for Research in Astronomy (AURA) is a consortium of universities and other institutions that operates astronomical observatories and telescopes. 

Founded October 10, 1957, with the encouragement of the National Science Foundation (NSF), AURA was incorporated by a group of seven U.S. universities: California, Chicago, Harvard, Indiana, Michigan, Ohio State, and Wisconsin.  The first meeting of the Board of Directors took place in Ann Arbor, Michigan.  Today, AURA has 47 member institutions in the United States and 3 international affiliate members.

AURA began as a small organization dedicated to ground-based optical astronomy, managing a range of 1- to 4-meter telescopes and providing community advocacy for optical/infrared astronomy.  Over the years, AURA expanded its focus to include Solar Astronomy and the Gemini 8-meter telescopes, going on to partner with other consortia such as WIYN (Wisconsin Indiana Yale & NOAO) and SOAR (Southern Astrophysical Research).  In the 1980s, AURA took on the management of the Space Telescope Science Institute, opening up the ultraviolet, optical, and infrared wavelength bands in space with the Hubble Space Telescope and in infrared space astronomy with the James Webb Space Telescope (JWST).

AURA is responsible for the successful management and operation of its three centers: NSF’s National Optical-Infrared Astronomy Research Laboratory (NOIRLab); the NSF's National Solar Observatory (NSO); and the Space Telescope Science Institute (STScI).

Centers
NSF’s NOIRLab is the US national center for ground-based, nighttime optical astronomy. The mission of NOIRLab is to enable breakthrough discoveries in astrophysics by developing and operating state-of-the-art ground-based observatories and providing data products and services for a diverse and inclusive community.  Through its five Programs — Cerro Tololo Inter-American Observatory (CTIO), the Community Science and Data Center (CSDC), International Gemini Observatory, Kitt Peak National Observatory (KPNO) and Vera C. Rubin Observatory — NSF’s NOIRLab serves as a focal point for community development of innovative scientific programs, the exchange of ideas, and creative development. 
NSF's National Solar Observatory (NSO) - AURA operates NSO which is located in Boulder CO and at the Daniel K Inouye Solar Telescope (DKIST) in Maui, Hawaii
Space Telescope Science Institute (STScI) - AURA manages STScI for NASA to carry out the science mission of the Hubble Space Telescope and to carry out the operations and science missions of the James Webb Space Telescope.
Construction project: The Vera C.Rubin Observatory - a public-private partnership to operate an 8.4-meter telescope on Chile’s Cerro Pachon.

President

President:  Dr. Matt Mountain

Dr. Mountain was appointed President of the Association of Universities for Research in Astronomy (AURA) 1 March 2015.  The President, as the chief executive officer, serves as the primary representative or spokesperson for AURA. The President is a member of the Board of Directors and implements policy decisions of the Board. The President serves the Board of Directors as its principal executive officer, providing leadership and guidance on policy matters, coordinating the activities of the Board and its various committees. The President is also responsible for maintaining effective working relationships with AURA Member Universities.

AURA Board of Directors
The Board, which meets quarterly, establishes the policies of AURA, approves its budget, elects members of the Management Councils, and appoints the President, the Center Directors, and other principal officers. The Board of Directors is responsible to the Member Representatives for the effective management of AURA and the achievement of its purposes.

Members
Today, there are 47 U.S. Member Institutions and 3 International Affiliate Members which comprise the Member Institutions of AURA.  The President of each Member Institution designates a Member Representative who has a voice in AURA matters.  Together, the Member Representatives act upon membership applications.

List of members as of 2022:
Boston University
California Institute of Technology
Carnegie Institution for Science
Carnegie Mellon University
Cornell University
Fisk University
Georgia State University
Harvard University
Indiana University Bloomington
Iowa State University
Johns Hopkins University
Keck Northeast Astronomy Consortium - a consortium of liberal arts colleges, including Colgate University, Haverford College (partnership with Bryn Mawr College), Middlebury College, Swarthmore College, Vassar College, Wellesley College, Wesleyan University, and Williams College.
Leibniz-Institut für Sonnenphysik
Massachusetts Institute of Technology
Michigan State University
Montana State University
New Jersey Institute of Technology
New Mexico Institute of Mining and Technology
New Mexico State University
Ohio State University 
Pennsylvania State University
Pontificia Universidad Catolica de Chile 
Princeton University
Rutgers University
Smithsonian Astrophysical Observatory
Stanford University
Stony Brook University
Texas A&M University
Universidad de Chile 
University of Arizona
University of California, Berkeley
University of California, Santa Cruz
University of Chicago 
University of Colorado Boulder
University of Florida
University of Hawaiʻi - system administers the Institute for Astronomy, Manoa administers educational programs
University of Illinois Urbana-Champaign
University of Maryland, College Park
University of Michigan 
University of Minnesota, Twin Cities
University of North Carolina at Chapel Hill
University of Pittsburgh
University of Texas at Austin
University of Texas at San Antonio
University of Toledo
University of Virginia
University of Washington
University of Wisconsin-Madison
Vanderbilt University
Yale University

Honours
The asteroid 19912 Aurapenenta was named in honour of the association's fiftieth anniversary, on 1 June 2007.

See also
 List of astronomical societies

References

Literature
Frank K. Edmondson. AURA and Its US National Observatories. — Cambridge University Press, 1997. — 367 p. — . — .

External links

1957 establishments in the United States
Astronomy organizations
Astronomy institutes and departments
College and university associations and consortia in the United States
International college and university associations and consortia
Scientific organizations established in 1957